The Oceania Youth Handball Championship is an Under 19 for Boys and Under 18 for Girls handball tournament organised by the Oceania Continent Handball Federation. The winners of these competition qualify for the IHF Men's Youth World Championship and IHF Women's Youth World Championship respectively.

For the boys there have only been two tournaments held. In 2007 Australia won and they proceeded to the 2007 Men's Youth World Handball Championship in Bahrain finishing 16th (last). Australia traveled to Tahiti for the second installment. The hosts won two of the three games to claim the title. The third was won by New Zealand in April 2011. They proceeded to the 2011 Men's Youth World Handball Championship in Argentina finishing 20th (last). The Cook Islands represented Oceania 2010 World Youth Games in Singapore finishing 6th (last). Both New Zealand and Australia did not take up their option. After a lengthy lay off, the Championship had its third title in  New Caledonia 2018. New Zealand retained their title. 

The girls first tournament was in 2009 in New Caledonia. The hosts beat Australia four games to nil  but Australia did represent Oceania in the 2010 World Youth Games in Singapore. The second tournament, a decade later, was again in New Caledonia where the hosts retained their title.

Champions

Men's competition

Participating nations

Women's competition

Participating nations

References

External links
 Oceania Continent Handball Federation web page
 Oceania on the International Handball Federation web page

Handball competitions in Oceania
Youth handball